Giancarlo Nicotra (30 April 1944 – 12 June 2013), sometimes spelled Gian Carlo Nicotra, was an Italian television writer, director and actor.

Biography 
Born in Rome, Nicotra was the son of the actors Mariannina Libassi and Antonio Nicotra. He started his career as a child actor in 1950, and his acting career included several leading roles. In 1968 he debuted as television director, collaborating with the musical show Canzonissima. During his career he was author and director of the sitcom Nonno Felice and of a number of popular variety shows, including Senza rete, La Sberla, Drive In, Grand Hotel, Portobello and Domenica in.

Selected filmography 
 Il nido di Falasco (1950)
 Tragic Serenade (1951)
 The Angels of the District (1952)
 Man, Beast and Virtue (1953)

References

External links 
 

1944 births
2013 deaths
Mass media people from Rome
Italian television directors
Italian film directors
20th-century Italian writers
20th-century male writers
Italian male film actors
Italian male child actors
Italian television writers
Male television writers
People of Sicilian descent